The Thirty-eighth Amendment of the Constitution of India, officially known as The Constitution (Thirty-eighth Amendment) Act, 1975, made the declaration of "The Emergency" final and conclusive. In particular it codified and enlarged the State's power to remove fundamental rights from its citizens during states of emergency.

Introduced on 22 July 1975, the bill received presidential assent in ten days. The Amendment barred judicial review of proclamations of emergency whether made to meet external, internal, or financial threats (Article 360 for the latter). It also barred judicial review of overlapping emergency proclamations, or ordinances promulgated by the President or by governors, and of laws enacted during emergencies that contravened Fundamental Rights.

Ratification

The Act was passed when it was ratified by more than half of the State Legislatures. State Legislatures that ratified the amendment are listed below:

 Andhra Pradesh
 Assam
 Bihar
 Haryana
 Himachal Pradesh
 Karnataka
 Kerala
 Madhya Pradesh
 Maharashtra
 Meghalaya
 Orissa
 Punjab
 Rajasthan
 Sikkim 
 Tripura
 Uttar Pradesh
 West Bengal

Did not ratify:
 Jammu and Kashmir
 Gujarat
 Manipur
 Nagaland
 Tamil Nadu

References

External links

 Full text - Thirty-eighth Amendment

38
1975 in India
1975 in law
Indira Gandhi administration
Emergency laws in India
Emergency management in India